Antoine Mahaut (1719, in Namur – c. 1785) was a Flemish flautist, composer, and editor. He probably learned his trade from his father who was also a flautist, and entered the service of Bishop of Strickland at the age of fifteen, with whom he travelled to London. The composer returned to Namur in 1737, where he served the wife of Walter de Colijaer until 1739. Mahaut spent his early composing career in Amsterdam and Mannheim, and his middle to late career in France. His symphonic style is similar to Johann Stamitz, who most likely taught him how to compose, while he was at Mannheim.  Mahaut influenced Joseph Haydn and Mozart. He was important as a symphonist in France and composed flute duets and trios and Dutch songs as well. He flourished in France, composing in a classical style and he died there in 1785 at the age of 65.

Mahaut's work enjoyed a lot of publications during the composers life. Aside of musical works, he also wrote a flute method titled Nouvelle méthode pour apprendre en peu de temps а jouer la flute traversière:Nieuwe manier om binnen korten tijd op de dwarsfluit te leeren spelen. A monthly magazine titled Maandelijks musikael tijdverdrijf was also published by him. It featured his aria's and songs, which were written in an Italian style.

External links

References

1720s births
1785 deaths
French Classical-period composers
French classical flautists
French male classical composers
18th-century classical composers
Flemish composers
People from Namur (province)
18th-century French composers
18th-century French male musicians